The Arjuna Award, officially known as the Arjuna Awards for Outstanding Performance in Sports and Games, is the sports honour of Republic of India. It is awarded annually by the Ministry of Youth Affairs and Sports. Before the introduction of the Rajiv Gandhi Khel Ratna in 1991–1992, the Arjuna award was the highest sporting honour of India.

Name
The award is named after Arjuna, a character from the Sanskrit epic Mahabharata of ancient India. He is one of the Pandavas, depicted as a skilled archer winning the hand of Draupadi in marriage and in the Kurukshetra War, Lord Krishna becomes his charioteer teaching him the sacred knowledge of Gita. In Hindu mythology, he has been seen as a symbol of hard work, dedication and concentration.

History
Instituted in 1961 to honour the outstanding sportspersons of the country, the award over the years has undergone a number of expansions, reviews, and rationalizations. The award was expanded to include all the recognised disciplines in 1977, has introduced indigenous games and physically handicapped categories in 1995 and introduced a lifetime contribution category in 1995 leading to creation of a separate Dhyan Chand Award in 2002. The latest revision in 2018 stipulates that the award is given only to the disciplines included in the events like Olympic Games, Paralympic Games, Asian Games, Commonwealth Games, World Championship and World Cup along with Cricket, Indigenous Games, and Parasports. It also recommends giving only fifteen awards in a year, relaxing in case of excellent performance in major multi-sport events, team sports, across gender and giving away of at least one award to physically challenged category.

The nominations for the award are received from all government recognised National Sports Federations, the Indian Olympic Association, the Sports Authority of India (SAI), the Sports Promotion and Control Boards, the state and the union territory governments and the Rajiv Gandhi Khel Ratna, Arjuna, Dhyan Chand and Dronacharya awardees of the previous years. The recipients are selected by a committee constituted by the Ministry and are honoured for their "good performance in the field of sports over a period of four years" at international level and for having shown "qualities of leadership, sportsmanship and a sense of discipline".

Recipients
In 2020, a total of twenty-seven individuals were conferred with the award. Individuals from nineteen different sports were awarded, which includes three from shooting, two each from athletics, badminton, boxing, cricket, hockey and wrestling, and one each from archery, basketball, equestrian, football, golf, kabaddi, kho kho, lawn tennis, rowing, swimming, table tennis and winter sports. Three individuals were also awarded from parasports.

In 2022, a total of twenty-five individuals have been conferred with the award. Individuals from fourteen different sports were awarded, which includes three from athletics, two each from badminton, boxing, chess, shooting and wrestling, and one each from hockey, judo, kabaddi, lawn bowls, mallakhamb, table tennis, weightlifting and wushu. Four individuals were also awarded from parasports.

List of recipients

Explanatory notes

References

External links
 Official Website

 
Indian sports trophies and awards
Lists of Indian award winners